Pectinobotys is a monotypic moth genus of the family Crambidae described by Eugene G. Munroe in 1959. Its only species, Pectinobotys woytkowskii, described in the same article, is found in Peru.

References

Spilomelinae
Taxa named by Eugene G. Munroe
Crambidae genera
Monotypic moth genera